Noyes Cottage is a historic cure cottage located at Saranac Lake in the town of Harrietstown, Franklin County, New York.  It was built about 1898 and enlarged in 1908.  It is a three-story, wood-frame dwelling in the Queen Anne style.  It has a stone foundation and multi-gabled roof.  It features six cure porches, including a two-story porch at the rear.

It was listed on the National Register of Historic Places in 1992. It is located in the Helen Hill Historic District.

References

Houses on the National Register of Historic Places in New York (state)
Queen Anne architecture in New York (state)
Houses completed in 1898
Houses in Franklin County, New York
National Register of Historic Places in Franklin County, New York
Individually listed contributing properties to historic districts on the National Register in New York (state)